Amelia "Mille" Gade Corson (February 11, 1897 – May 1, 1982) was a Danish-born American long-distance swimmer who is best known as becoming the seventh person, third American and second woman to successfully swim across the English Channel. Earlier, Corson had completed the swim around Manhattan Island, a distance of 42 miles, and had also completed the swim from Albany, New York, to New York City, swimming the distance in a total of 5 days, 3 hours and 11.5 minutes. The straight-line distance between the two points is 143 miles, but Corson swam an extra 10 miles due to various detours.

Biography
Born in Copenhagen, Denmark, in 1897. Her father was a physician who was sure that his daughter would become a musician or prima donna, but she was uninterested in piano and voice lessons. She started swimming at age six and rapidly became an expert swimmer and started a school of swimming instruction. Seeking greater opportunities, she came to the United States in 1919. She had much trouble getting established there. Trying to find a notable accomplishment to highlight her background, she asked a man standing on the Harlem River how far she could swim along the shore and he replied that it was between 30 and 40 miles. Not realizing that Manhattan is an island, she made the 42 mile distance in a time of 16 hours.

Corson had been an instructor for three years at the YWCA in Harlem and then taught swimming to sailors on the USS Illinois battalion armory of the New York Naval Militia, located on the Hudson River at the foot of 96th Street. In preparation for the Channel swim, Corson implemented a plan for daily exercise that she had received from racewalking champion Louis Leibgold, the physical director of the Illinois. She never had a swimming instructor and her preparatory steps for the English Channel swim were based on the guidance of an expert in the Channel's tides and weather conditions.

Her next effort was the swim from Albany to New York City, a distance of 143 miles. She needed someone to shadow her in a rowboat while doing the swim, and received a volunteer in the person of Clemington Corson, assistant superintendent of the USS Illinois. She never left the water, but would stop at the nearest town along the shore and then set out again early the next morning. She swam 153 miles on the 143 mile straight-line route and covered the distance in a total of 5 days, 3 hours and 11.5 minutes, including 66 hours of swimming time. Becoming close from their relationship on the Albany-NYC trip she married Corson, and by 1926 she had two children, a two-year-old daughter and a son who was four years old. The children stayed with an aunt in Virginia while Corson worked on her record swims.

Her first attempt to make the English Channel crossing came in 1923, when she had made the first 21 miles in 14.5 hours and had reached two miles from the coast of France, but was forced to concede failure after a tide carried her seven miles away from shore. In July 1922, she swam the 22 miles from Dover to Ramsgate in 6 hours and 20 minutes, with an hourly sugar cube providing her with the energy needed for the swim. Her time was only six minutes off the record set by Frank Perks.

Leibgold introduced Corson to L. Walter Lissberger, a local businessman with an interest in sports who financed the $3,000 in expenses she and her husband incurred in preparing for the Channel swim. Lissberger made a wager with Lloyd's of London betting that she would succeed in crossing the Channel, and received a payout of $100,000 at odds of 20–1 when she completed her swim. She was one of three swimmers who were trying to make the swim across the Channel at the same time starting at 11:32 at night on August 28, 1926, leaving from Cape Gris Nez. The two men with her failed, Egyptian swimmer Ishak Helmy dropping out after three hours and an English swimmer failing one mile from Dover's Shakespeare Cliffs. In the wake of criticism that Gertrude Ederle had benefited from swimming alongside a tugboat, Corson's motorboat and her husband's row boat remained 20 to 70 yards away at all times. By 5:00 am, Corson appeared to be on a pace to break Ederle's record, but the ebb tide, the wake of a Dutch steamship and changes in wind direction set her back. She said that when she was struggling she thought of her children and that "their two dear faces were always in front of me". Her husband, who had followed her in a rowboat, called her "the finest girl and the best swimmer in the world!" With her husband rowing nearby in a dory and providing her with hot chocolate, sugar lumps and crackers, she was able to complete the swim, in a time of 15 hours and 29 minutes, one hour longer than the record set by Gertrude Ederle three weeks earlier that summer.

Corson sailed to New York City aboard the RMS Aquitania, where she was reunited with her family and given an official welcome by the city's official greeter, who escorted her by car for a ticker-tape parade up Broadway to New York City Hall where she was welcomed by Mayor Jimmy Walker.

She died in Croton on Hudson, New York, on May 26, 1982.

References

1897 births
1982 deaths
American female swimmers
English Channel swimmers
Swimmers from Copenhagen
Danish emigrants to the United States
20th-century American women
20th-century American people
Manhattan Island swimmers